Scanzorosciate is a comune (municipality) in the Province of Bergamo in the Italian region of Lombardy, located about  northeast of Milan and about  northeast of Bergamo.

Scanzorosciate borders the following municipalities: Cenate Sopra, Cenate Sotto, Gorle, Nembro, Pedrengo, Pradalunga, Ranica, San Paolo d'Argon, Torre de' Roveri, Villa di Serio.

References